The Conveyance of Prisoners (Ireland) Act 1837 (1 & 2 Vict. c. 6) was an Act of Parliament in the United Kingdom, signed into law on 23 December 1837. It directed that the expenses of conveying prisoners were to be paid by the paymaster of the appropriate constabulary force, and then repaid by grand jury presentment.

References
The British almanac of the Society for the Diffusion of Useful Knowledge, for the year 1839. The Society for the Diffusion of Useful Knowledge, London, 1839.

1837 in British law
United Kingdom Acts of Parliament 1837
Acts of the Parliament of the United Kingdom concerning Ireland
1837 in Ireland